Vladimir Alekseyevich Klementyev (born January 4, 1956, in Leningrad, now St. Petersburg) is a Soviet professional football coach and a former player.

Honours
 Soviet Top League champion: 1984.
 Soviet Top League bronze: 1980.
 USSR Federation Cup finalist: 1986.

External links
 Career summary by KLISF

1956 births
Living people
Footballers from Saint Petersburg
Soviet footballers
Russian footballers
Soviet Top League players
FC Zenit Saint Petersburg players
FC Lada-Tolyatti players
Association football forwards
FC Dynamo Saint Petersburg players